Zheng Yajun (born October 1961) is a former Chinese politician who spent his entire career in northwest China's Gansu province. He was investigated by China's top anti-graft agency in September 2021. Previously he served as deputy chairperson of the Environmental Resources Protection Committee of Gansu People's Congress and before that party secretary of Pingliang, and party secretary and mayor of Jiayuguan.

Biography
Zheng was born in Ning County, Gansu, in October 1961. From September 1979 to September 1980, he was a coal-mine worker. In September 1980, he was accepted to Gansu Education College (now Lanzhou University of Arts and Science), where he majored in Chinese.

After university in 1982, he worked in government. He joined the Chinese Communist Party (CCP) in June 1985. He spent 12 years working at the Organization Department of CCP Gansu Provincial Committee before serving as deputy director of the General Office of CCP Lanzhou Municipal Committee in December 1996. In August 2001, he was dispatched to the General Office of CCP Gansu Provincial Committee, and was reassigned to the General Office of Gansu Provincial People's Government in August 2001. In November 2002, he became deputy party secretary of Jiayuguan, rising to party secretary in August 2011. He concurrently served as mayor of Jiayuguan from January 2009 to September 2011. In March 2016, he became party secretary of Pingliang, serving in the post until May 2017, when he was appointed deputy chairperson of the Environmental Resources Protection Committee of Gansu People's Congress.

Downfall
On 2 February 2021, he was put under investigation for alleged "serious violations of discipline and laws" by the Central Commission for Discipline Inspection (CCDI), the party's internal disciplinary body, and the National Supervisory Commission, the highest anti-corruption agency of China. He was detained for suspected bribe taking on July 20. On September 12, he was indicted on suspicion of accepting bribes.

References

1961 births
Living people
People from Ning County
Lanzhou University alumni
Central Party School of the Chinese Communist Party alumni
People's Republic of China politicians from Gansu
Chinese Communist Party politicians from Gansu